The 2001 Marlboro Masters of Formula 3 was the eleventh Masters of Formula 3 race held at the Circuit Park Zandvoort in Zandvoort, Netherlands on 5 August 2001. The 25-lap race was won by Takuma Sato, for Carlin Motorsport who started from the pole position and led every lap. André Lotterer of Jaguar Racing finished in second, 9.2 seconds behind Sato, whose teammate Anthony Davidson placed third.

Drivers and teams

Notes

Classification

Qualifying

Group A

Group B

Race

References

Masters of Formula Three
Masters of Formula Three
Masters of Formula 3
Masters of Formula Three